Second-order election is a term that appeared for the first time in Karlheinz Reif and Hermann Schmitt's "Nine second-order national elections – A conceptual framework for the analysis of European election results" article for the [European Journal of Political Research, in 1980]. It was used to analyze the first European Parliament elections, held in 1979 in the, then, nine member states of the European Economic Community. According to the "second-order elections" approach, European Parliament elections were "second-order" in that they were viewed as less important by voters, parties and the media than first-order elections. 

First-order elections are those that determine the government and/or executive power in a political system, i.e., national elections. They are first-order in that they are seen as more important by parties, voters and the media. Local and regional elections are also considered second-order elections. 

Second-order elections present the following characteristics: turnout is expected to be lower than in national elections, voters are more prone to vote for protest parties, or parties in the periphery of the political system, rather than the usual mainstream parties they would vote for in a national election. As a result, second-order elections are often used by voters to punish or reward the current governing parties. 

Regarding EP elections, empirical evidence has shown that all six EP elections (1979, 1985, 1989, 1994, 1999, 2004) have been second-order elections. However, the second-order elections approach has not been confirmed for the twelve new member states of the European Union (Bulgaria, Czech Republic, Cyprus, Estonia, Hungary, Latvia, Lithuania, Malta, Poland, Romania, Slovakia, Slovenia).

References

Political science terminology